The arboreomorphs (Arboreomorpha) are ediacaran beings of the frondomorph type that had a disk or bulb-shaped anchor on the ocean floor, a central stem and branching. The "branches" were smooth, tubular structures, often swollen with bifurcation and connected together to form a leaf-like structure. 

Thaumaptilon is considered as one of the few cases that reached the Cambrian, though its placement is controversial. Some authors classify this group within Rangeomorpha and others together with Erniettomorpha in a larger group called Frondomorpha.

References

Petalonamae
Ediacaran
Ediacaran life
Aquatic animals